John McDonough  (born November 1951), is a British businessman, and was CEO of Carillion from January 2001 to December 2011.

Early life
John McDonough was born in November 1951. He earned a degree in mechanical engineering from Imperial College London in
1972.

Career
McDonough started his career at Massey Ferguson. He joined Johnson Controls in 1991, as UK managing director, Automotive Systems Group (ASG), rising to vice president, integrated facilities management, Europe, the Middle East and Africa, and a member of the senior management team, until his appointment as Carillion CEO.

McDonough was CEO of Carillion from January 2001 to December 2011 and has been blamed for the company's switch of focus from construction to services. He retired in December 2011, having reached the age of 60, and was succeeded as CEO by the chief operating officer, Richard Howson.

McDonough is chairman of Vesuvius Group SA, since October 2012, a past chairman of the CBI's Construction Council (2008-2011) and vice-chairman of the CBI's Public Services' Strategy Board. He has been chairman of Sunbird Group since September 2014.

Honours
McDonough was appointed a CBE in 2011, for services to industry.

References

Living people
1951 births
British chief executives
Commanders of the Order of the British Empire
Alumni of Imperial College London
Carillion people